Seidelmann Yachts was an American boat builder based in Berlin, New Jersey. The company specialized in the design and manufacture of fiberglass sailboats.

The company was founded by Bob Seidelmann in 1977.

History

Bob Seidelmann was a sailmaker and one design sailor, winning championships in Lightnings, Comets and Dusters, as well as several other one-design racing classes. He founded a sailmaking business, Seidelmann Sails, with his father, Joe Seidelmann, in the early 1960s. He was co-designer of the 1972 Hunter 25 with John Cherubini, which became Hunter Marine's first production boat. He began designing his own boats and started Seidelmann Yachts to produce them.

The first designs produced were the Seidelmann 25, Seidelmann 30 and the Seidelmann 30-T, all in 1977. Reviewer Steve Henkel reports in The Sailor's Book of Small Cruising Sailboats that some  Seidelmann 25s suffered from poor construction quality.

Aside from building Bob Seidelmann's own designs, in 1980, the company became the first builder of the Sonar, which had been designed by Canadian naval architect Bruce Kirby, designer of the Laser. The boat sold 60 copies the first month after it was introduced.

Seidelmann also collaborated with Kirby on the 1981 design of the Seidelmann 24 racer-cruiser.

The company went out of business in 1986, just nine years after its founding, in the downturn in the sailboat market following the early 1980s recession in the United States.

Boats 
Summary of boats built by Seidelmann Yachts:

Seidelmann 25 - 1977
Seidelmann 30 - 1977
Seidelmann 30-T - 1977
Seidelmann 299 - 1979
Seidelmann 37 - 1980
Sonar (keelboat) - 1980
Seidelmann 24 - 1981
Seidelmann 34 - 1981
Seidelmann 245 - 1981
Seidelmann 295 - 1982

See also
List of sailboat designers and manufacturers

References

Seidelmann Yachts